Djougou Rural is a municipality located in the department of Donga in the State of Benin .  It includes the territory outside the city of Djougou.

References 

Arrondissements of Benin
Communes of Benin
Populated places in Benin